Thomas Ellsworth Martin (January 18, 1893June 27, 1971) was a United States representative and Senator from Iowa. Martin, a Republican, served in Congress for 22 consecutive years, from January 1939 to January 1961.

Born in Melrose, Iowa, he attended the public schools and graduated from the State University of Iowa (in 1916) and from its College of Law (in 1927). He received his LL.M. from Columbia Law School in 1928 and was a sales analyst and accountant for a rubber company in Akron, Ohio, and Dallas, Texas, in 1916 and 1917. During the First World War he served as a first lieutenant with the Thirty-fifth Infantry, United States Army, from 1917 to 1919.  After the war, he continued work in the rubber industry, then became an assistant professor of military science and tactics at the University of Iowa from 1921 to 1923. He was admitted to the Iowa bar in 1927 and commenced practice in Iowa City, of which he served as city solicitor from 1933 to 1935 and mayor from 1935 to 1937.

In 1938, Martin was elected as a Republican to the U.S. House of Representatives, serving Iowa's 1st congressional district. He was re-elected to the House seven consecutive times, serving from January 3, 1939, to January 3, 1955.

In 1954, instead of running again for the House, Martin ran for the U.S. Senate.  He defeated incumbent senator Guy M. Gillette, who was then completing his second full term in the Senate. For the first time since 1924, both of Iowa's senators, and all of its representatives, were Republicans.  Martin served from January 3, 1955, to January 3, 1961. Martin voted in favor of the Civil Rights Acts of 1957 and 1960. He retired after one term, moving to Seattle, Washington, where he died in June 1971. He was buried in Willamette National Cemetery, Portland, Oregon.

References

External links
 

1893 births
1971 deaths
American accountants
United States Army personnel of World War I
United States Army officers
University of Iowa alumni
Columbia Law School alumni
Politicians from Akron, Ohio
University of Iowa College of Law alumni
Iowa lawyers
Republican Party United States senators from Iowa
Burials at Willamette National Cemetery
People from Monroe County, Iowa
Republican Party members of the United States House of Representatives from Iowa
20th-century American politicians
Washington (state) Republicans
20th-century American lawyers
Military personnel from Iowa